Rowe Street may refer to:
 Rowe Street, Sydney, Australia
 Rowe Street (NJT station), an abandoned train station in the town of Bloomfield, New Jersey, United States
 Rowe Street Baptist Church, in Boston, Massachusetts, United States